The Errol Solomon Meyers Memorial Lecture (E.S. Meyers Memorial Lecture) is an annual free public Lecture hosted by the University of Queensland Medical Society (UQMS) in Brisbane.

Professor Errol Solomon Meyers was a founding father of the Faculty of Medicine at the University of Queensland, which was established in 1936 after five decades of advocacy for a medical school in Queensland. A pioneer in professional health education in Queensland, Professor Meyers was a leader in postgraduate medical education and undergraduate and postgraduate dental education prior to the establishment of the Faculties of Medicine and Dentistry at the University of Queensland. In July 1957, one year after the death of this founding father, the University of Queensland Medical Society established the E.S. Meyers Memorial Lecture to honour his contributions to medicine in general, and to his role as one of the most significant founders of the Medical School in particular.

As a reflection of the ethos of Professor Meyers’ life, this Memorial Lecture comprises a forum for a person of distinction to present a perspective of endeavour and achievement. Past speakers include biologist Lord Robert Winston, cricketer and politician Mr Imran Khan, Nobel Laureate Professor Peter Doherty, author Lord Jeffrey Archer and mountaineer and diplomat Sir Edmund Hillary.

Professor Errol Solomon Meyers

Professor Errol Solomon Meyers was a key founder of the University of Queensland School of Medicine. From 1925, he was a leader in postgraduate medical education courses conducted at the British Medical Association (Queensland Branch), and was the doyen of surgical anatomy. A general surgeon and teacher of outstanding ability, Professor Meyers taught anatomy and surgical dissection to dental students in Brisbane from 1922, establishing an Anatomy School within the dental hospital in George Street in 1927. From that time Dr Meyers brought the strength of his considerable personality to bear on the need to establish a School of Medicine in Queensland, a triumph achieved finally on 13 March 1936.

Education was one of Professor Myers’ passions. Discussions around the need for a medical faculty in Queensland began as early as 1893, and from the mid-1920s Professor Meyers advocated this case strongly. When the Faculty was finally inaugurated in 1936, Professor Meyers was appointed lecturer in anatomy, before becoming Dean in 1941. His standing as a medical educator was such that he was one of only two Australians to be invited to speak at the inaugural World Conference on Medical Education in 1953. Despite all of these accolades, perhaps the best marker of Professor Meyers’ success was his standing within the student body. Professor Meyers exhibited all of the qualities of an exceptional clinical teacher including a passion for education and enthusiasm for learning. He was much loved, admired and respected by the medical student body for his contribution to medical education.

The Memorial Lecture

The Errol Solomon Meyers Memorial Lecture is the premier academic event on the University of Queensland Medical Society’s calendar. The lecture is a special tribute to the life of Professor Meyers, and a wonderful opportunity to bring together members of the medical, university and general community. The UQMS is grateful for the support and contribution of the Meyers family and our past orators, who have assisted the ES Meyers Memorial Lecture to become one of the largest public lectures of its kind in the Southern Hemisphere.

Recent Memorial Orators (since 2000)
2016 – Dr Ranjana Srivastava, author and oncologist in disadvantaged areas of Melbourne.

2013 – Dr Nicholas Coatsworth, past President and current Director for Médecins Sans Frontières Australia. Deputy Director of Disaster Preparedness and Response at the National Critical Care and Trauma Response Centre in Darwin. "Unexpected Journeys: From Darfur to Darwin"

2012 – Dr James Morton, Clinical Haematologist/Oncologist, Mater Private Hospital. Founder of World's Greatest Shave and AEIOU. "Sliding Doors"

2011 – The Hon Michael Kirby, former Justice of the High Court of Australia, "HIV/AIDS and law reform: Desperate need to move mountains"

2010 – Commander Paul Luckin, Anaesthetist in the Royal Australian Naval Reserve, specialist in Rescue Medicine, "Disasters, rescue and retrieval”

2009 – Dr Rowan Gillies, Former International Council President of Médecins Sans Frontières. "Challenges in Humanitarian Assistance”

2008 – Professor Graeme Clark, Founder/Pioneer of the bionic ear. Senior Australian of the Year 2001. "The multi-channel cochlear implant; the first clinically successful sensory interface between the world of sound and human consciousness”

2007 – Dr. Charlie Teo, Australian Neurosurgeon, "That which doesn't kill you makes you stronger" (50th Anniversary)

2006 – Professor Fiona Wood, 2005 Australian of the Year, "Striving for excellence in health care”

2005 – Professor William P. Schecter, Professor of Clinical Surgery, UCSF Chief of Surgery, San Francisco General Hospital "Terrorist Mass Casualty Events in Israel: Historical Context and Clinical Management”

2004 – Robert C. Gallo, director, Institute of Human Virology, University of Maryland – "HIV in the third decade. Lessons from the Past Experiences and Future Prospects”

2003 – Prof Jonathan Sprent, Professor of Immunology, The Scripps Research Institute, California "T Cells and the Thymus”

2002 – Prof Alan Trounson, "Discussing Embryos and Embryonic Stem Cells: Creating New Medical Directions”

2001 – Prof Earl Owen, Specialist in Microsurgery and Infertility Surgery, Sydney. "Microsurgical Reflections, First Hand”

2000 – Lord Robert Winston, Professor of Fertility Studies, London, "Will We Still Be Human at the End of the 21st Century?”

Full List of Orators
 2016 Ranjana Srivastava, "Ars longa, vita brevis"
 2014 Mark Loane, "Reflections on 20 Years of Remote Eye health"
 2013 Nicholas Coatsworth, "Unexpected Journeys: From Darfur to Darwin"
 2012 James Morton, "Sliding Doors"
 2011 Michael Kirby, "HIV/AIDS and law reform: Desperate need to move mountains"
 2010 Paul Luckin, Disasters, rescue and retrieval
 2009 Rowan Gillies, Challenges in Humanitarian Assistance
 2008 Graeme Clark, The multi-channel cochlear implant; the first clinically successful sensory interface between the world of sound and human consciousness
 2007 Charles Teo, That which doesn't kill you makes you stronger
 2006 Fiona Wood, Striving for excellence in health care
 2005 William P. Schecter, Terrorist Mass Casualty Events in Israel: Historical Context and Clinical Management
 2004 Robert C. Gallo, HIV in the third decade. Lessons from the Past Experiences and Future Prospects
 2003 Jonathan Sprent, "T Cells and the Thymus”
 2002 Alan Trounson "Discussing Embryos and Embryonic Stem Cells: Creating New Medical Directions”
 2001 Earl Owen, "Microsurgical Reflections, First Hand”
 2000 Robert Winston, "Will We Still Be Human at the End of the 21st Century?”
 1999 Mike Toole, Public Health Responses to Humanitarian Crise
 1998 Karl Kruszelnicki, Great Moments in Science
 1997 Peter C. Doherty, How We Deal With Viral Infections
 1996 Grant Sutherland, The Human Genome Project and Medical Practice in the 21st Century
 1995 Jeffrey Archer It Takes Nineteen Hours a Day to be a Best-seller
 1994 Imran Khan, From Centuries to Service
 1993 Gabi Hollows, Vision and Outreach
 1992 Edmund Hillary, After Everest: Health, Religion and Education in the Himalayas
 1991 Struan Sutherland, Reflections on Venomous Pursuits
 1990 Sheila Sherlock, Alcohol and the Liver
 1989 Neal Blewett, Care, Concern and Conscience
 1988 Victor Chang, The Australian Heart Transplant Programme – Past Progress and Future Dreams
 1987 Gustav Nossal, Vision of a New Therapeutic Future
 1986 Max Lake, The Excitement of Wine
 1985 David Penington, The Future of Medical Practice in Australia
 1984 Hiram Baddeley, The Shandong Medical School in China
 1983 Arthur Guyton, "Hypertension: A Current Analysis”
 1982 Douglas M Saunders, In Vitro Fertilization
 1981 Norelle Lickiss, The Quality of Life and Death: The Possibilities and Limits of Medical Practice
 1980 Louis Opit, Medical Practice in Australia
 1979 E Parry, Health and Urban Change in Africa
 1978 N Groots, Autism in Indians: An Unspoken Problem
 1977 Charles Kerr, Uranium and Health
 1976 D Llewelly-Jones, Talking Doctors
 1975 Thomas Szasz
 1974 W Gillies, China: A Medical Visitor’s Viewpoint
 1973 P Erbech
 1972 Dr Bevan
 1971 H Seeliger, The Development of Social and Preventive Medicine in Western Africa
 1970 Percy Spender,
 1969 Evan Thomson, Training in Surgery
 1968 Martin Roth, The Changing Concept of Medical Education
 1967 M Carseldine, A GP Reminisces
 1966 D Jackson, Changing Attitudes to Paediatrics over the Last 30 Years
 1965 T O'Leary, Aerial medical evacuation with special emphasis on the precautions necessary in particular circumstances
 1964 Konrad Hirschfeld, Some Aspects of Medical Education
 1963 D Gordon, Memories of Joe
 1962 WJ Saxton, The Person
 1961 AE Lee, Voluntary Health Insurance in Australia
 1960 GAC Douglas
 1959 FWR Lukin Yesterday, Today and Tomorrow
 1958 LJJ Nye
 1957 NG Sutton, Comprehensive Medicine

Medical associations based in Australia
Meyers, Errol Solomon
1957 establishments in Australia